The Indians Fire was a wildfire in the Ventana Wilderness of the Los Padres National Forest in the Santa Lucia Range which that started on June 8, 2008 and burned uncontained until July 10 scorching  of land.  This fire burned predominantly within the Los Padres National Forest, Monterey Ranger District, inside the Ventana Wilderness. Other affected properties include portions of Fort Hunter Liggett military base and private property.  The suppression cost exceeded $40.7 million, not including resource damages and rehabilitation costs.

On June 10, 2008, a residential structure on the Chase Ranch burned down.  The ranch had restricted access; therefore, the damage was not documented by the Forest Service.  A Forest Service Fire Prevention Technician risked her life to evacuate the reluctant cabin owner, just before the fire burned over the cabin.

On June 11, 2008, during a burnout operation, aggressive fire behavior produced a fire plume which burned over Forest Service firefighters along the Del Venturi Road. An entrapment occurred when a rotating vertical plume developed and the crew became overcome by the fire. Three firefighters sustained major burns and were evacuated from the fire.

Cause

The fire was ignited when an unattended campfire escaped into the vegetation during the night. Two subjects admitted to lighting the campfire that escaped from their control, and using the campfire without removing all flammable material from around the campfire. One camper awoke during the night to find Escondido Campground on fire.  After their brief attempt to put out the fire, they hiked out 2.7 miles to their vehicle.  Then drove out through the Fort Hunter Liggett main gate, at 3:58 a.m., without stopping to report the fire.  The fire burned undetected for an additional 8 ½ hrs. until a hiker walking along a ridge, saw the smoke from 10 miles away and reported it at 12:36 p.m.

The escaped campfire occurred when the campfire ring had not been cleared of flammable ground litter and the campers went to sleep with the fire still burning. A burning log, which extended outside of the campfire ring, burned through and fell into oak leaf litter surrounding round the fire ring. The forest litter ignited and continued to spread during the night. The fire burned for a period of at least 5–6 hours before it escaped the campground. If the fire had been reported after it initially ignited, it would have been suppressed and contained the same day. The two subjects responsible for causing the Indian Fire pleaded guilty in Federal court.

References

Wildfires in Monterey County, California
2008 California wildfires
Santa Lucia Range
Monterey Ranger District, Los Padres National Forest
June 2008 events in the United States
July 2008 events in the United States